Richard George Tiltman (born 14 December 1960) is an English former professional footballer who played as a forward in the Football League for Brighton & Hove Albion. He also played for Maidstone United in the Alliance Premier League, for Southern League Premier Division club Crawley Town, and for a large number of Sussex-based clubs at lower levels, as well as for teams in Australia.

Tiltman was born in Shoreham-by-Sea, Sussex. Outside football, he ran a financial services business in Worthing.

References

1960 births
Living people
People from Shoreham-by-Sea
English footballers
Association football forwards
Littlehampton Town F.C. players
Worthing F.C. players
Maidstone United F.C. (1897) players
Crawley Town F.C. players
Brighton & Hove Albion F.C. players
Bognor Regis Town F.C. players
Shoreham F.C. players
St. Leonards F.C. players
Isthmian League players
National League (English football) players
Southern Football League players
English Football League players